Desjarlais may refer to:

Desjarlais, Alberta, a locality in Canada

Surname 
 Bev Desjarlais (1955–2018), Canadian politician
 Blake Desjarlais (2021-present), Canadian politician
 Bob Desjarlais, Canadian labour leader
 Harley Desjarlais, regional Métis leader in Canada  
 Robert Desjarlais (1907–1987), Canadian fencer
 Scott DesJarlais (born 1964), American politician and physician